Velika Trnovitica is a village and municipality in Bjelovar-Bilogora County, Croatia. There are 1,370 inhabitants in the municipality, 94.8% of whom are Croats.

Notable people
Žiga Hirschler - composer, music critic and publicist

References

Municipalities of Croatia
Populated places in Bjelovar-Bilogora County